Dolomiti Energia S.p.A. is an energy company in the field of electricity and natural gas headquartered in Trento, Italy. The company was established in 2009. Dolomiti Energia employs about 1,961 people in Italy. Chairman of the board is Rudi Oss and chief executive officer is Marco Merler.

History
Dolomiti Energia was established in 2009 in Trento with the merger of Dolomiti Energia and Trentino Servizi. Dolomiti Energia was the majority shareholder of the hydroelectric power stations of Trentino Alto Adige and Trentino Servizi takes its name becoming the new Dolomiti Energia.

In September 2009, Dolomiti Energia acquired the majority of Multiutility S.p.A. headquartered in Verona, and during the same year it acquired 100% of Avisio Energia, which will change its name into Dolomiti Reti S.p.A..
In 2010 Dolomiti Energia acquired PVB Power Bulgaria, an energy company in the field of hydroelectricity in Bulgaria. In March 2021, the share package was sold for 5 millions of euros to Akuo, a group founded by a club of former managers of EDF who worked in Bulgaria.

In November 2011 it was established Sf Energy, a joint venture between Dolomiti Energia, Sel and Enel Produzione for the management of the hydroelectric plant of San Floriano del Collio.  In 2012 Dolomiti Energia became shareholder for the 7% of Edipower S.p.A.. Dolomiti Energia is the main sponsor of Aquila Trento, which play in Serie A.

In July 2016, Dolomiti Energia Trading debuted at European Energy Exchange.

Dolomiti Energia, although many shareholders are public entities, is able to sponsor the sports club Aquila Basket Trento which plays in the top Italian basketball league (Serie A). He took second place in the 2016/17 season and in the 2017/18 season.

Activity

The Group's operating statement in 2012 gave the following data :
Electric Energy
customers connected to the grid: 300.688
km medium voltage network: 3.089
km low voltage network: 6.544
Gwh energy produced: 1.850
Gwh energy distributed: 2.400
Gwh energy sold: 3.824
Natural Gas
customers connected to the natural gas network: 146.780
km natural gas network: 2.241
m³ natural gas distributed: 289.000.000
m³ natural gas sold: 428.000.000
Environment
Tons of waste collected: 76.364
Recycling Trento: 66.78%
Recycling Rovereto: 60.86%
Water
Aqueduct users: 84.841
Aqueducts under management: 17 (oltre 200.000 abitanti)
Sewage treatment plants: 16
km water supply network managed: 1.338
m³ of water delivered to the grid: 32.000.000
District heating and cogeneration
Gwh steam produced: 63.4
Gwh heat produced: 61.4

Major shareholders
As of 2011 members of Dolomiti Energia are:
 Private shareholders
 FT Energia: 11,80 %
 A2A: 7,9%
 Fondazione Caritro: 5,3%
 ISA: 4,1%
 EnerGo: 1,8
 Public shareholders
 FinDolomiti Energia: 47,8%
 Comune of Trento: 5,8%
 Comune of Rovereto: 4,3%
 Other comuni: 2,8%
 Bacino imbrifero montano–BIM: 2,0%
 Local multi-utility
 STET: 1,8%
 AGS: 1,2%
 AIR: 1,0%
 ACSM Primiero: 0,8%
 Other companies: 1,6%

References

External links
 Dolomiti Energia website  Retrieved 14 June 2016

Electrical engineering companies of Italy
Electric power companies of Italy
Energy companies established in 2009
Italian brands
Partly privatized companies of Italy
Italian companies established in 2009